Masillaraptoridae is an extinct family of stem-group falconiform birds from the Eocene of Europe. They are noted for their relatively long legs. Two genera have been named: Danielsraptor, from the London Clay of England, and Masillaraptor, from Messel Pit in Germany.

Description 
Masillaraptorids had long legs, which may indicate that they had a terrestrial lifestyle, foraging on the ground similar to modern caracaras. They had large pygostyles, suggesting that they would have likely had long tail feathers. This, in addition to their long ulnae, suggest that they were capable of well-developed flight. Their beaks are similar to those of extinct phorusrhacids and extant caracaras.

Classification
The cladogram below displays the phylogenetic position of Masillaraptoridae within the Falconiformes:

References

Falconiformes
Prehistoric bird families